Iris subdichotoma is a plant species in the genus Iris, it is also in the subgenus Limniris and in the section Lophiris (crested irises). It is a rhizomatous perennial, from Tibet and China, with pale blue, blue-purple, purple, violet or white flowers. It is cultivated as an ornamental plant in temperate regions.

Description
It has short rhizome with a few branches. Below is thick roots. On top of the rhizomes are the brown, fibrous remains of last seasons leaves, surrounding the new leaves.

It has grey-green, sword-shaped and slightly curved leaves. They do not have any mid-veins.
The leaves are generally short than the flower stems.

The stems have between 2–5 branches.

The plant is very similar in form to Iris dichotoma  but only smaller.

The stems have 3–5 green, spathes (leaves of the flower bud), which have membranous margins.
The bracts are similar in size to Iris dichotoma.

The stems (and branches) hold between 2 and 4 flowers, between June to August. But normally in June.

Later, a white flowering form was found and then was published and named as Iris subdichotoma f. alba Y. G. Shen, in 'Acta Bot. Yunnan' Vol.26 Issue5 page492 in 2004). Although this is now classified as a synonym of Iris subdichotoma.

It has 2 pairs of petals, 3 large sepals (outer petals), known as the 'falls' and 3 inner, smaller petals (or tepals, known as the 'standards'. The falls have a central yellow crest. The standards are narrow and oblanceolate, and 3 cm long and 4 mm wide.

It has a 2 cm long perianth tube, 2.2 cm long stamens, 1.5 long and 0.5 cm wide, fusiform (spindle-shaped) ovary and 3 cm long style branches. The styles branches have narrowly triangular lobes. It also has filaments that are longer than the anthers.

It has 6 longitudinal ribs. The capsule when ripe, splits a third of the way down, releasing the seeds.
The seeds are 7.5 – 8.5 mm wide, maroon-brown and have a small wings.

Genetics
In 2006, 13 species of Iris, including Iris subdichotoma, Iris delavayi and Iris cuniculiformis were studied for a  cytological analysis of the chromosome counts.

In 2007, the chromosomes of Iris dichotoma, Iris domestica (Belamcanda chinensis) and Iris subdichotoma were also studied.

As most irises are diploid, having two sets of chromosomes, this can be used to identify hybrids and classification of groupings.
Iris subdichotoma has a count of 2n=42.

Taxonomy
It has the common name of 'Zhongdian iris'. Note; 'Zhongdian' is an older name for Shangri-La City. It is written as 中甸鸢尾 in Chinese script and known as  zhong dian yuan wei in Pidgin Chinese.

The Latin specific epithet subdichotoma refers to Iris dichotoma (Also known as the Vesper Iris). 'Dichotoma' means forked in pairs or having 2 branches. It is very similar in form to Iris dichotoma but smaller.

It was first published and described by Yu Tang Zhao in 'Acta Phytotaxonomica Sinica' (Acta Phytotax. Sin. published in Beijing) Vol.18 Issue 1 on page 57 in 1980.

It was verified by United States Department of Agriculture Agricultural Research Service on 4 April 2003 and then updated on 29 September 2008. Iris subdichotoma is an accepted name by the RHS.

Distribution and habitat
It is native to temperate regions of Asia.

Range
It has been found in Chinese province of Yunnan, in China.

It has been found on Haba Snow Mountain, and beside the Yangtze River.

Habitat
It grows in grasslands, on open hillsides or on banks or slopes beside rivers.

References

Sources
Mathew, B. 1981. The Iris. 205.
Waddick, J. W. & Zhao Yu-tang. 1992. Iris of China.

External links

subdichotoma
Plants described in 1901
Flora of Central Asia
Flora of China